Juraj Mokráš (born  in Považská Bystrica) is a Slovak bobsledder.

Mokráš competed at the 2014 Winter Olympics for Slovakia. He teamed with driver Milan Jagnešák, Lukáš Kožienka and Petr Narovec in the four-man event, finishing 25th.

As of April 2014, his best showing at the World Championships is 21st, in the 2012 two-man event.

Mokráš made his World Cup debut in November 2010. As of April 2014, his best finish is 10th, in a four-man event in 2010-11 at Whistler.

References

1990 births
Living people
Olympic bobsledders of Slovakia
Sportspeople from Považská Bystrica
Bobsledders at the 2014 Winter Olympics
Slovak male bobsledders